Kardeş Payı is a Turkish television series produced by NTC Medya. The main characters are two brothers (Ahmet Kural and Murat Cemcir) and their sister (Seda Bakan). The two brothers are plumbers, however they are trying to invent an engine, working with boron or water. Their goal is to make the world a better place. The father of the characters is a fanatic fan of Besiktas and he gave  the names of 3 legendary football players of Besiktas to his kids. Metin, Ali, Feyyaz. But surprisingly the third child was a girl so he changed the name of Feyyaz to "Feyyza". The first season started airing on 13 February 2014 on Star TV in Turkey and ended in June 2014. The second season started in January 2015 and made its finale on 30 April 2015.

Production 
The show is written and directed by Selçuk Aydemir, it is edited by Ali Kadı and produced by Mehmet Yiğit Alp's NTC Medya. The theme music "Kardeş Payı" is by Aytekin Ataş. It is airing on Thursday nights at 22:45 since February 13, 2014 on Star TV.

Characters

Episodes

Broadcast

External links 
 
 Kardeş Payı on Star TV
 Kardeş Payı on tvyo
 Kardeş Payı on Facebook
 Kardeş Payı on Twitter
 Kardeş Payı on Instagram
 Kardeş Payı on Sinematürk

Turkish comedy television series
2010s sitcoms
2014 Turkish television series debuts
Star TV (Turkey) original programming